Abdullah Bozkurt (born 1971) is a Turkish journalist. He was the bureau chief for the Gülen-aligned newspaper Today's Zaman.

Biography
Bozkurt started his work in journalism with the newspaper Zaman. He worked as the New York Bureau Chief and Washington Representative of Zaman Newspaper. Afterwards, he continued the same work for the newspaper Today's Zaman.

In 2011, Bozkurt defended the imprisonment of journalists in the Ergenekon investigation stating that journalists like Ahmet Şık were not being an investigative journalist conducting "independent research", but was hatching "a plot designed and put into action by the terrorist network itself".

Bozkurt has lived outside Turkey since the failed 2016 Turkish coup d'état attempt. In Turkey, he has a warrant out for his arrest stemming from allegations of membership in the Gülen movement, which the Turkish government considers to be a terrorist group. Terrorism charges are frequently used by the Turkish government against dissident journalists. In June 2020, a segment on the private television station TGRT Haber called for Bozkurt to be "exterminated".

In Sweden, Bozkurt created the Nordic Research & Monitoring Network (or Nordic Monitor), of which he is the director.

See also 
 Gülen movement
 Turkey's media purge after the failed July 2016 coup d'état

References 

1971 births
Living people
Turkish journalists
Turkish exiles
Turkish expatriates in Sweden